The 1974–75 season was Sport Lisboa e Benfica's 71st season in existence and the club's 41st consecutive season in the top flight of Portuguese football, covering the period from 1 July 1974 to 30 June 1975. Benfica competed domestically in the Primeira Divisão and the Taça de Portugal, and participated in the European Cup Winners' Cup after being runners-up in the 1974 Taça de Portugal Final.

After failing to retain the title in the past season, manager Fernando Cabrita was replaced by Milorad Pavić. With almost no signings in the transfer market, Benfica biggest departures were Rui Rodrigues and Zeca. After a lengthy pre-season, Benfica started their campaign with two victories against Belenenses and Farense. They dropped points in the third week, before winning the following two matches, reaching first place. In October, they drew with Boavista and lost at home to Porto, falling to third place. Four consecutive wins followed, until three draws in December cost them first place. Benfica lapped the first part of the season with a three-point deficit to Porto, but managed recover that in January. A draw in early February, with Académica de Coimbra stopped them, but the team reacted with five consecutive wins, opening a five-point lead by mid March. Benfica was then knocked out of the Cup Winners' Cup by PSV Eindhoven and lost for the league with Vitória de Setúbal, cutting their advantage to three-points. Nonetheless, in early May, Benfica confirmed their 21st league title, their 12th since 1960.

Season summary
Benfica started the new season trying to recover the title lost to Sporting in the past season. Fernando Cabrita was replaced by Milorad Pavić, who was the second choice to Miljan Miljanić. Miljanić initially agreed with the club, but in March 1973, he back-tracked on his word, so he could sign with Real Madrid. Pavić, the former teacher of Miljanić, signed a 2-year deal on 22 April. Three days later, the Carnation Revolution changed the course of the country. In the transfer market, Benfica made almost no new signings but also only had three departures, Rui Rodrigues and Zeca, being the more noteworthy. The pre-season began on 19 July, with Pavić arriving to Portugal later in the same day. The first training sessions were in Serra da Estrela, before the club embarked on a tour in Mexico and United States in early August. Afterwards, they competed in the Trofeo Ciudad de Sevilla and the Independence Cup in Brazil.

Benfica started their league campaign with victories against Belenenses and Farense, reaching top of the table, ex aequo with Porto. On match-day 3, they dropped their first points, in a home draw with Olhanense. They reacted by winning their following two league matches, while also easily progressing in the Cup Winners' Cup. On 13 October, Benfica visited Estádio do Bessa to play Boavista and drew 0–0. That resulted in them being caught in first place by Vitória de Guimarães and Porto. A week later, Benfica lost at home with Porto by 1–0 and dropped to third place, two points shy of leaders Porto and Guimarães. They reacted positively to the loss and won their next four Primeira Divisão matches, retaking first place albeit shared with Porto. Both had 18 points. In Europe, Benfica qualified for the quarter-finals, after eliminating Carl Zeiss Jena in the second round. Off the field, Benfica lost Eusébio to injury, as he underwent his six operation to his left knee.
On match-day 12, Benfica drew 0–0 with Oriental and dropped to second, a point from leaders Porto. In the final three matches of December, Benfica won the first but drew the others. First with Sporting on the 22, for the Derby de Lisboa, and then on the 29, with União de Tomar. Benfica lapped the first half of the season in second place with three points less than leaders Porto.

In January, Benfica won their opening match, while Porto lost theirs, reducing the gap between them to a point. Two weeks later, Benfica defeated Olhanense on the road and Porto lost in Alvalade, with the teams exchanging places. Benfica now led by a point over Porto. In the last match of the month, Benfica defeated Leixões at home, and Porto lost again, which increased Benfica's advantage to three-points, 31 to 28. However, a draw with Académica de Coimbra on 2 February, cut that lead to two points. In mid February, Benfica visited Estádio das Antas for the Clássico, defeating Porto by 3–0. Benfica had now a three-point lead over Sporting, who overtook Porto for second place. The team continued on their winning run, and on match-day 25, they added two more points in their difference over Sporting, which had lost in Bessa. However, Benfica would experienced a troubled third week of March. First they were knocked-out of the European Cup Winners' Cup by PSV Eindhoven at home. President Borges Coutinho attributed the defeat to a friendly of the national team, 9 days earlier in Goiânia; which negatively affected the Benfica players used. He called it "completely useless". On 23 March, Benfica lost with Vitória de Setúbal and saw his lead over Sporting reduced to three-points. They reacted with two consecutive wins, before meeting Sporting in Estádio de Alvalade on 4 May. Only needing a draw to win the title, they drew 1–1 and celebrated their 21st league title. It was their 12th in the past 16 seasons, and the 21st in the 41 editions of the Primeira Divisão. Three weeks into May, Pavić announced his departure, with Benfica signing Mário Wilson as his replacement. Before the season ended, Pavić qualified Benfica for the Taça de Portugal Final, where they would play Boavista. They lost 2–1 with the goal from former Benfica youth player, João Alves being decisive. Captain Toni said: "We wanted to offer this Cup to Pavić. More than everyone else, he deserved it because of what he had done throughout the season...".

Competitions

Overall record

Primeira Divisão

League table

Results by round

Matches

Taça de Portugal

European Cup Winners' Cup

First round

Second round

Quarter-final

Friendlies

Player statistics
The squad for the season consisted of the players listed in the tables below, as well as staff member Milorad Pavić (manager), Fernando Cabrita (assistant manager), Fernando Neves (Director of Football).

Transfers

In

Out

Out by loan

Notes

References

Bibliography
 
 
 

S.L. Benfica seasons
Benfica
Portuguese football championship-winning seasons